is a bus company in Nagano Prefecture, Japan.

Headquarters
2131-1 Oshimada-machi Nagano City, Nagano Prefecture 381-2212 JAPAN 
Telephone Number: +81-26-254-6700

Area
Nagano City
Shinano Town
Myōkō City, Niigata
etc.

History
1925 - Foundation as Kawanakajima Jidōsha (川中島自動車)
1966 - Opening of Nagano Bus Terminal
1983 - Voluntary petition to Nagano District Court for application of Corporate Rehabilitation Act; Court's election of Itaru Takizawa, then vice president of Matsumoto Electric Railway, as trustee 
1984 - Joining into Matsumoto Electric Railway Group (Matsuden Group)
1984 - Change of corporate name to Kawanakajima Bus
1988 - Opening of Misuzu Highway Bus
1991 - End of corporate rehabilitation procedures
1992 - Rename of Matsuden Group to Alpico Group
2006 - Introduction of hybrid coach

Lines

Highway Lines
Nagano - Shinjuku Line <Keio Dentetsu Bus>
Alpine Nagano-go (Nagano - Kyoto, Osaka) <Hankyu Bus>
Chuo-do Kosoku Bus
Nagano - Nagoya <Meitetsu Bus>
Misuzu Highway Bus
Nagano - Matsumoto - Iida <Ina Bus and Shinnan Kotsu>
Nagano - Matsumoto <Matsumoto Electric Railway>
Nagano - Usuda Line <Chikuma Bus>
Nagano - Kamikōchi (closed at winter season)
Nagano - Myokokogen (opened at winter season)

See also
Matsumoto Electric Railway
Suwa Bus

External links
Kawanakajima Bus
St. Maarten Car Rentals

Bus companies of Japan
Companies based in Nagano Prefecture